Tepper Aviation, Inc. was a privately held aviation company operating a fleet of Lockheed L-100 Hercules aircraft and was one of the largest civilian operators of L-100/L-382 aircraft. The airline may have suspended operations in 2006. On October 11, 2016 Tepper filed papers changing its name to Gulf Air Group, effective in 2017. In 2019, Gulf Air Group opened the Covington Maintenance Center at Southern Alabama Regional Airport in Andalusia, Alabama.

Tepper was based at the Bob Sikes Airport in Crestview, Florida. The company had a long association with the Central Intelligence Agency (CIA). In the late 1980s and early 1990s, it was widely reported to be flying weapons into Angola to arm the UNITA rebels. In 2005, the Council of Europe said it was investigating allegations that the CIA was using the company's aircraft for extraordinary rendition transporting suspected terrorists through Europe.

Alleged CIA affiliation

In early 1989, the UK Independent reported Tepper's involvement in Angola:

The CIA has appointed a new airline to ferry weaponry to the US and South African-backed Unita guerrillas fighting the Marxist government in Angola. The CIA's previous airline for this task was forced to close after media revelations. Tepper Aviation, based in Crestview, Florida, operates a Hercules freighter aircraft which, according to former employees, has flown between the Kamina air base in southern Zaire and Unita-held territory in eastern Angola. Tepper was set up in late 1980, after the demise of the CIA's previous carrier, St. Lucia Airways, whose activities, in addition to the Angolan work, included the transport of Colonel North and weapons to Iran... Bud Petty, who heads Tepper, categorically denies that the Hercules has been in Zaire or Angola.

Petty died months later in the crash of Hercules aircraft N9205T in Angola, as reported by Flight International:

The Lockheed L-100 Hercules which crashed while on a US Central Intelligence Agency mission in Angola late last month was owned and operated by Tepper Aviation, a Florida-based company with a history of involvement with CIA operations. Bud Petty, the head of Tepper Aviation, was piloting the aircraft and was killed in the crash along with, at least two West Germans, a Briton and a second American. The aircraft, painted grey and known as the 'Grey Ghost', came down at night on 27 November as it was coming in to land at Jamba, the main base of the UNITA guerrillas fighting Angola's Marxist Government. The aircraft was carrying a cargo of weapons, plus several guerrillas, as well as the Europeans and Americans.

According to The Book of Honor by Ted Gup, Petty was the head of Tepper at the time:

The lumbering cargo plane that would take him into Angola was to be one of the 'Gray Ghosts,' so named for their slate-colored paint. The plane had four seats in the front -- for a pilot, copilot, navigator, and loadmaster. The fuselage was largely open for cargo. On board that night was a seasoned crew of six. Even by Agency standards, it had a distinctly international flavor. Heading the team was Pharies 'Bud' Petty, a veteran Agency pilot who, at least on paper, presided over a Florida firm called Tepper Aviation, located in Crestview, just off Eglin Air Force Base. The other crew members were all ostensibly employees of Tepper.

Gup's book identifies Gracie T. Petty as Petty's widow.

See also
 List of defunct airlines of the United States
Aero Contractors (US)
Air America
Gulf Air Group
Pallas Aviation
Rendition aircraft

References

Further reading
 "CIA resumes Angola covert flights", Flight International, March 21, 1990.
 Alan George, "US weapons boost Angolan rebels", The Guardian (UK), June 25, 1990.
 "USA step up Unita supply", Flight International, June 27, 1990.
 "Tepper Aviation plans US internal cargo services", Flight International, March 4, 1992.
 Richard K. Kolb, "Into the Heart of Darkness. Cold War Africa: Part 2, Angola", VFW Magazine (Veterans of Foreign Wars of United States), May 1999. Via archive.org. Mentions Tepper's role in Angola.
 George Wright, " The Destruction of a Nation: United States Policy Toward Angola Since 1945", page 151. . Mentions Tepper's activities in Angola.
 Lars Olausson, "Lockheed Hercules Production List 1954-2009", Volume 26, self-published, Såtenäs, Sweden, April 2008, no ISBN, lists Tepper L-100 operations.
 Peter C. Smith, "Lockheed C-130 Hercules: The World's Favourite Military Transport". . Publisher: Airlife Pub Ltd, November 2001. Mentions Tepper.

Defunct airlines of the United States
Cargo airlines of the United States
Central Intelligence Agency operations
Central Intelligence Agency front organizations
Extraordinary rendition program
Airlines based in Florida
2006 disestablishments in Florida
1987 establishments in Florida